Walter Schütz (25 October 1897 – between 27 and 29 March 1933) was a German communist politician.

Biography 
Schütz was born in Wehlau (today Znamensk, Russia), where he attended school. He was trained as a machine fitter and worked at the municipal electricity works of Königsberg.

After World War I he worked as a car mechanic and joined the Communist Party of Germany (KPD) in 1919. Schütz became the East Prussian Chairman of the Communist Party and Chief editor of the communist newspaper for East Prussia "Echo des Ostens" (Echo of the East).

Schütz was elected as a member of the Reichstag in September 1930. He was arrested by the Nazi-SA in February or March 1933 and tortured and murdered in the SA headquarters of Königsberg.

Literature 
 Hermann Weber/Andreas Herbst: Deutsche Kommunisten. Biographisches Handbuch 1918 bis 1945, Berlin: Karl Dietz Verlag 2004, p. 709

References

External links 
 picture

1897 births
1933 deaths
People from East Prussia
Communist Party of Germany politicians
Members of the Reichstag of the Weimar Republic
People from Gvardeysky District
Executed people from Kalinigrad Oblast
People killed by Nazi Germany